Simeon (died 21 November 1093) was a relative of King William I of England and the brother of Walkelin, Bishop of Winchester. It was through his brother's influence that Simeon was made prior of Winchester, then in 1082 Abbot of Ely, where he began work on the present Ely Cathedral. He recovered for the monastery of Ely the lands which had been allotted to the Normans during their siege of the island of Ely when it was held by Hereward the Wake.

Serlo died in 1093, at the age of 100. On his death the temporalities of the monastery were seized by Ralph Flambard, the minister of William Rufus, and no abbot was appointed until the accession of Henry I in 1100.

Citations

References
 
 

993 births
1093 deaths

Abbots of Ely
Ely Cathedral
Normans in England
Norman clerics given benefices in England
11th-century English clergy